Events in the year 1862 in Norway.

Incumbents
Monarch: Charles IV

Events
23 June – Norway's second railway, Hamar-Grundsetbanen, is opened.
3 October – Kongsvingerbanen, Norway's third railway opens between Lillestrøm and Kongsvinger, is opened.

Arts and literature

The poem Terje Vigen, written by Henrik Ibsen, is published.

Births

January to June
22 February – Hulda Garborg, writer, novelist, playwright, poet, folk dancer and theatre instructor (died 1934)
14 March – Vilhelm Bjerknes, physicist and meteorologist (died 1951)
16 June – Olaf Frydenlund, rifle shooter and Olympic silver medallist (died 1947)
25 June – Thomas Wegner Larsen Haaland, politician

July to December
4 August – Albert Gran, Norwegian-American actor (born 1932)
15 August – Fernanda Nissen, journalist, literary critic, theatre critic, politician and feminist pioneer (died 1920)
21 September – Johan Castberg, jurist and politician (died 1926)
23 September – Bernt B. Haugan, Norwegian American minister, politician and temperance leader
24 September – Arnt Severin Ulstrup, physician and politician
14 November – Ludvig Larsen Kragtorp, physician and politician

Full date unknown
Samuel Balto, explorer and adventurer (died 1922)
Johan Olaf Bredal, politician and Minister (died 1948)
Jørgen Brunchorst, politician and Minister (died 1917)
Anna Bugge, feminist (died 1928)
Ove Christian Charlot Klykken, politician
Anders Sandvig, dentist and ethnologist (died 1950)

Deaths
30 September – Josephine Thrane, teacher and journalist (born 1820).

Full date unknown
Jon Eriksson Helland, Hardanger fiddle maker (born 1790)
Knut Mevasstaul, rose painter (born 1785)
Jørgen Herman Vogt, politician (born 1784)

See also

References